Bob Wood may refer to:

Entertainment
 Bob Wood (comics) (1917–1966), comic book artist during the Golden Age of Comics
 Bob Wood (author) (born 1957), author of Dodger Dogs to Fenway Franks and Big Ten Country

Politics
 Bob Wood (MP) (born 1940), Liberal Member of Parliament for Nipissing in the Canadian House of Commons, 1988–2004
 Bob Wood (Ontario MPP) (born 1949), Progressive Conservative Member of Provincial Parliament for London South and London West in the Legislative Assembly of Ontario, 1995–2003

Sports
 Bob Wood (baseball) (1865–1943), Major League Baseball catcher
 Bob Wood (basketball) (1921–2014), National Basketball Association player
 Bob Wood (ice hockey) (1930–2007), ice hockey player in the National Hockey League

See also
 Bob Woods (disambiguation)
 Bobby Wood (disambiguation)
 Robert Wood (disambiguation)